Jean Frantz Massenat Jr. (born January 17, 1992) is an American-Haitian professional basketball player for JL Bourg of the French LNB Pro A. In his collegiate career at Drexel University, He was named to the First Team All-CAA following the 2011–12 season as a sophomore, leading the Drexel Dragons to 2012 CAA men's basketball tournament where they were narrowly defeated by Virginia Commonwealth University.  Massenat started in every game of his collegiate career at Drexel.  Following his senior season, he ranked sixth on Drexel's career scoring list with 1,646 points, and his 548 career assists ranked third all-time at Drexel and ninth in CAA history.

High school
Massenat attended Trenton Catholic Academy high school in Hamilton, New Jersey.  In his senior year, he led the basketball team to the school's first ever NJSIAA Tournament of Champions title, defeating Camden Catholic High School by a score of 53–39 at the Izod Center on March 23, 2010.  That season, Massenat was named the team's Most Valuable Player and earned the honors of a Second Team All-State selection.  Academically, Massenat also was a member of the honor roll throughout his four years in high school.

College
In his freshman season at Drexel University, Massenat started every game for the Dragons at point guard, and was named to the Colonial Athletic Association (CAA) All-Rookie Team.  During that season, he recorded 11 assists in a game against Niagara, which tied Michael Anderson for the school record for most assists in a game by a freshman.

The following season, Massenat led the CAA in three point percentage (.450), assists per game (4.8), and assist/turnover ratio (2.2).  He was named to the CAA All-Tournament Team, and Drexel won the CAA regular season title for the first time in program history.

In his junior season at Drexel, Massenat led the conference in assists per game again with 4.8 and started every game of the season for a third straight year.  A career highlight occurred at a game against Hofstra, when Massenat hit a game winning 50-foot three point shot as time expired.  The shot was featured on SportsCenters "Top Ten Plays" the following day.

In this senior year, Massenat received first-team honors for the second time after leading the conference in assists (4.8 apg) and ranking seventh in scoring (17.4 ppg). He also topped the conference and was among the best in Division I in both assist/turnover ratio and total assists.

Professional
Following his final season at Drexel, Massenat signed with the sports management group Walton Sports.  Massenat worked out for the Washington Wizards on June 17, 2014 before going undrafted in the 2014 NBA draft. On July 6, 2014, the Washington Wizards announced that Frantz Massenat was added to their 2014 NBA Las Vegas Summer League roster. However, Massenat would decline the invitation after signing to Mitteldeutscher BC later that week.

Mitteldeutscher (2014–2016)
On July 9, 2014, it was announced that Massenat signed a one-year contract with Mitteldeutscher BC.

EWE Baskets (2016–2019)
On May 25, 2016, EWE Baskets Oldenburg announced that Massenat signed a 3-year contract with the team.

Andorra (2019–2020)
On July 4, 2019, Massenat signed with MoraBanc Andorra of the Liga ACB. He averaged 8.4 points and 2.1 rebounds per game in EuroCup.

Victoria Libertas Pesaro (2020–2021)
On July 21, 2020, he has signed with Victoria Libertas Pesaro of the Italian Lega Basket Serie A (LBA).

Saski Baskonia (2021)
Pesaro ended the season in the 13th position. Massenat, then, was signed by Saski Baskonia for the ACB Playoffs.

Niners Chemnitz (2021–2022)
On August 15, 2021, Massenat signed with Niners Chemnitz of the Basketball Bundesliga.

JL Bourg (2022–present) 
He inked a deal with French ProA side JL Bourg on June 29, 2022.

National Team 
Massenat, who is of Haitian origin (his parents were born there), was a member of Haiti's men's national team.

The Basketball tournament
Frantz Massenat played for the Talladega Knights in the 2018 edition of The Basketball Tournament. In 4 games, he averaged 11.8 points, 4.8 assists, and 1.5 steals per game. The Knights reached the Northeast Regional Championship before falling to the Golden Eagles.

References

1992 births
Living people
American expatriate basketball people in Germany
American expatriate basketball people in Spain
American expatriate basketball people in Italy
American men's basketball players
Basketball players from New Jersey
BC Andorra players
Expatriate basketball people in Andorra
Drexel Dragons men's basketball players
EWE Baskets Oldenburg players
JL Bourg-en-Bresse players
Lega Basket Serie A players
Liga ACB players
Mitteldeutscher BC players
NINERS Chemnitz players
People from Ewing Township, New Jersey
Point guards
Saski Baskonia players
Sportspeople from Mercer County, New Jersey
Haitian men's basketball players
Trenton Catholic Academy alumni
Victoria Libertas Pallacanestro players